The 1986 East Coast Conference men's basketball tournament was held March 1–3, 1986.  The champion gained and an automatic berth to the NCAA tournament.

Bracket and results

* denotes overtime game

All-Tournament Team
 Leroy Allen, Hofstra
 Mark Allsteadt, Bucknell
 Michael Anderson, Drexel – Tournament MVP
 Luke Murphy, Hofstra
 John Rankin, Drexel

Source

References

East Coast Conference (Division I) men's basketball tournament
Tournament